Vincent Edouard André Koziello (28 October 1995) is a French footballer who plays as a midfielder for Belgian Challenger Pro League club Virton on loan from Oostende.

Club career
Koziello is a youth exponent from OGC Nice. He made his Ligue 1 debut on 1 November 2014 against Olympique Lyonnais, replacing Grégoire Puel after 72 minutes in a 1–3 home defeat.

In January 2018, he joined Bundesliga side 1. FC Köln on a -year contract until 2022. The transfer paid to Nice was reported as €3.3 million plus potential bonuses.

On 28 April 2018, he came off the bench as Köln lost 3–2 to SC Freiburg which confirmed Köln’s relegation from the Bundesliga.

On 11 January 2023, Koziello was loaned by Virton.

Personal life
Koziello was born in France, and is of Polish descent through his paternal grandfather. He is a youth international for France.

Career statistics

Honours
1. FC Köln
2. Bundesliga: 2018–19

References

External links

 

1995 births
French people of Polish descent
People from Grasse
Sportspeople from Alpes-Maritimes
Footballers from Provence-Alpes-Côte d'Azur
Living people
Association football midfielders
French footballers
France youth international footballers
France under-21 international footballers
AS Cannes players
OGC Nice players
1. FC Köln players
1. FC Köln II players
Paris FC players
C.D. Nacional players
K.V. Oostende players
R.E. Virton players
Championnat National 2 players
Ligue 1 players
Bundesliga players
2. Bundesliga players
Regionalliga players
Ligue 2 players
Primeira Liga players
Belgian Pro League players
Challenger Pro League players
French expatriate footballers
Expatriate footballers in Germany
French expatriate sportspeople in Germany
Expatriate footballers in Portugal
French expatriate sportspeople in Portugal
Expatriate footballers in Belgium
French expatriate sportspeople in Belgium